Alángup Qáqai is a mountain range located in southwestern Disko Island, in West Greenland. Administratively this range is part of Qeqertalik Municipality.

References

Mountain ranges of Greenland
Nunataks of Greenland
Qeqertalik